Santegidiese Calcio Società Sportiva Dilettantistica is an Italian association football club based in Sant'Egidio alla Vibrata, Abruzzo. Its currently plays in Eccellenza.

History 
The club was founded in 1948.

Serie D 
The club were promoted from the Eccellenza Abruzzo to Serie D following a first-place finish in the 2005–06 season.

In the season 2011–12 it was relegated to Eccellenza.

Colors and badge 
Their official colors are yellow and red.

External links 
Official homepage

Association football clubs established in 1948
Football clubs in Abruzzo
1948 establishments in Italy